Parliamentary elections were held in Greece on 2 June 1985. The ruling PASOK of Andreas Papandreou, was re-elected, defeating the liberal conservative New Democracy party of Constantine Mitsotakis (Mitsotakis succeeded Evangelos Averoff as ND leader in 1984).

Results

References

Parliamentary elections in Greece
Greece
Legislative
1980s in Greek politics
Greece